Colonia District is one of thirty-three districts of the province Yauyos in Peru.

See also 
 Challwaqucha
 Upyanqa
 Wankarqucha

References